Goroumo is a village in the Central African Republic prefecture of Ouham-Pendé, close to the western border with Cameroon, that in 2008 was attacked by bandits who killed almost all the male inhabitants. BBC reporter Mike Thomson wrote that many of the bandits were veteran fighters from past coups.

Notes

2008 in the Central African Republic
Massacres in the Central African Republic
Former populated places in the Central African Republic
Ghost towns in Africa
Massacres of men
Populated places in Ouham-Pendé
Violence against men in Africa